Edmund Martin Herzig (born February 1958) is a British professor, historian, and author. He is currently the Soudavar Professor of Persian Studies, he is part of the faculty of Oriental studies at the University of Oxford, and also has served (1988–2006) as a lecturer in Iranian studies at the University of Manchester. His principal areas of research are the histories of Iran, the Caucasus, Armenia, and the Armenian people with an emphasis on the Armenians of Iran.

Education
Herzig received his BA in Russian and Persian from the University of Cambridge, while he received his DPhil in Oriental Studies at the University of Oxford. His graduation thesis was entitled 'The Armenian Merchants of New Julfa, Isfahan: A Study in Pre-Modern Asian Trade'.

Publications

Sources
 
 
 

1958 births
20th-century British historians
21st-century British historians
Soudavar Professors of Persian Studies
Fellows of Wadham College, Oxford
People associated with the University of Manchester
Iranologists
Armenian studies scholars
Living people